The Podenco Valenciano or Xarnego Valenciano is a hound breed of dog originating in Valencian Community, Spain. This breed is known by several names, according to the different areas of the Valencian geography: Xarnego, Xarnego Valenciano, Gos coniller, Podenco Valencíano. It was officially recognized by the Real Sociedad Canina de España in 2017.
 
This breed has three types of hair, smooth (liso), rough/hard (duro) and long/"silky" (sedeño), being the only type of Iberian podencos/pondengos having the latter type of hair also transmitted, as with some other autochthonous breed, of randomly way among litters that born of straight hair. The sedeño variety of this breed is known as "Polserut", local word for a particular type of coat in this breed, though long, is substantially different in layout and texture.

History
For the historical background and the morphological type with which the breed has come down to today, the Xarnego represents the genuine type of hound that with more integrity in its structure has kept safe from the stakes of other exogenous influences. Also known in the Valencian Community as "Gos Coniller" which makes complete reference to its functional ability, rabbit hunting in any form.

A reference appears in the tomb of who is a historical figure of the first magnitude in the Valencian area, Cesare Borgia (the sculpture of the tomb was made by the Basque artist Victoriano Juaristi), where it illustrate a figure of Cesare accompanied with a Spanish podenco dog. It is believed that this was a Xarnego due to its ample physical similarities and also by the geographical location.

Physical features

Colours

The classic colours into the breed are cinnamon, black, brown and chocolate, monocolored or preferably mixed with white areas that appear on the face, neck, termination and abdomen.

Size
 Males 55 to 61 cm. Weighing about 20 kg.
 Females 50–57 cm. Weighing about 18 kg.

Fur
In the Podenco Valenciano it defined three types of hair:

The smooth and straight hair, about 1.5 cm. long, with a difference of ± 0.5 in lower neck and back of the thigh. Straight hair look bright and net, seated on the skin. Cover tail. Some specimens present plume tail and fringed in hind legs.
The rough and hard hair, more than 2.5 cm, which it define as bearded. "Bristly" body hair and bristly hairy tail of no more than the beard. Straight or semicircular hair of rough aspect that rises slightly on the skin. There is no undercoat.
The semi-long and silky hair, from 4 cm, although in some areas of the body may be less long. The sedeños not have hairs in beards but in all other parts of the body, highlighting the flaps, tail and chest where in winter is usually rich, sometimes exuberant. The hair is thin, flexible, soft and silky, the longest sometimes is rolling. There is no undercoat.

Functionality

Hunting
Its main function in work is the rabbit hunting in all its forms and grounds, equipped with a good venatoria attitude, and suited to a variety of different ecosystems that exist throughout the Mediterranean basin and particularly in the Spanish Levante and Ebro valley. It is equipped with a good ear and eye, with a portentous smell, making it a versatile hunting dog.

See also
 Dogs portal
 List of dog breeds
Xarnego, a derogatory word derived from this breed.

References

Dog breeds originating in the Valencian Community
Hounds
Rare dog breeds